Bystrík Režucha (14 January 1935, Bratislava – 16 August, 2012) was a Slovak conductor. He was a chief conductor of the Slovak Philharmonic Orchestra.

References

External links
 Biography

1935 births
2012 deaths
Slovak conductors (music)
Male conductors (music)
Musicians from Bratislava